Marianne Deml  (born 8 March 1949) is a German politician, representative of the Christian Social Union of Bavaria. Since 1990 she has been a member of the Landtag of Bavaria. From June 1993 to January 2001 she was State Secretary in the Bavarian State Ministry for Food, Agriculture and Forestry.

See also
List of Bavarian Christian Social Union politicians

References

External links
Official site

Christian Social Union in Bavaria politicians
1949 births
Living people